In every fortification system there is one fortress that dominates the others: the master-tower. The  Clock Tower of Sighișoara is the main entry point to the citadel, opposite guarded by Tailors' Tower. With its 64 meters of height, the tower is visible from almost every corner of the city from Mures County, its purpose was to defend the main gate of the citadel and also served as the town hall until 1556. Now It's considered one of the most expressive clock tower in the whole Transylvania.

History 

The tower began to be built at the end of 13th century, It was built in the 14th century as a simple gate tower with a maximum of two levels: the ground floor and first two floors of the tower were made of sandstone and river rock, the first stage of the tower construction probably had a form identical to the Tailors tower. The thickness of the base walls were 2.35 meters, 1.30 meters on the second floor,  stone tiles of basalt were used only at the corners. In the 16th century the old roof was demolished, they have added two floors built of brick and it was built a balcony and the roof. Nobody knows for sure how the roof was before the 1676 fire. The actual 5 turrets baroque roof with bulbs represents an exceptional achievement of the three Pilgrim masters: Veit Gruber from Tyrol, Philip Bong of Salzburg and carpenter Valentinus Auslander, who rebuilt the tower after the great fire of 1676 from March to September 1677 for 650 florins. What makes this tower unique in all the country is its clock with puppets inside.

It's a historical symbol of Sighișoara, and, despite all the other towers that were owned and defended by different guilds, the Clock Tower was a public good. It used to host the Public Administration, and, during holidays, the city orchestra; since the end of 19th century though it hosts the History Museum of Sighișoara. Another important feature of this tower is the balcony which is the most important observation point of the city: the wide view allowed to sight eventual fires in time in order to reach promptly one of the nine places in all Sighișoara that could provide water. It was vital to prevent the spread of flames because at that time the city did not dispose of much water; it was necessary in fact to dig for 35m to find a source of water.

Restorations 

The tower was modernized in 1964 with an electric motor, without diminishing the archaic effect of the clock. Since 1898, the tower serves as a museum in Sighișoara, a title that gives to it the status of symbol of the citadel and the main attraction for visitors.

Architectural Features 

The tower is a rectangular prism with massive walls, with a rectangular base measuring 12x8,66 meters, with four floors and an observation gallery. The current distance between the base of the tower and the base of the roof is 30 meters, and the height of the roof, from the base to the top is 34 meters, so the roof is taller than the tower. The base of the tower is crossed by two vaulted semi cylinder parallel passages dated 13th century,  provided in the past with solid oak doors and metal gratings, whose traces can still be partially seen today. Tower carries many signs of local authority: the four turrets placed on the corners of the roof, 12.5 m high, are symbols of autonomy of the State, which can pronounce and execute sentences to capital punishment. Also the clock and some figurines on inside can be considered symbols of public authority, as the 1 meter diameter golden scope on the summit of the roof. The tower keeps two clock mechanism, one in wood and one in metal, correspondingly to the age of the crafts. Two facades (one facing the citadel, the second facing the lower city) hold a clock dial of 2.3 meters diameter, with black and gold hand-painted clock numbers. Two niches with symbolic figurines on the inside are located on the left of the dials. In the niche facing the Citadel are arranged, on three levels, the following figures:
 Peace Goddess (in the bottom on the left), holding in hands an olive branch and a trumpet;
 The little drummer (on the right side), who, with an hammer on his right hand, hits a little bronze drum;
 Justice and Righteousness (in the center). This two figures in blue dresses dominate the composition, and they are bigger than the others indeed: Justice is blindfolded and rises a sword with her hand, while Righteousness keeps a balance.
 Day and Night (in the upper pulpit), fixed on a metal balance,  represented as two angels: Day has a head and a heart flame burning in her hands, and Night carries a torch in each hand. They actually marked the appearance of alternatives at 6 AM and 6 PM, the 12 hours day’s work for the craftsmen of the Citadel.
The niche located into the facade facing the Lower City has only two sections or levels:
 in the bottom left is placed a second little drummer (identical to its counterpart on the other front), and on the right is located a figure which has lost some attributes, representing, perhaps, "the Executioner”, holding in her hands, very likely, a whip and an ax, as a warning to outlaws.
 The central position is dominated by a rotating platform in which are mounted seven wooden figures representing the days of the week, but only one of them can be seen from the Lower City through the right small window with ornamental wooden fretted. Every night at 12 o’clock, the round platform rotates from left to right a few degrees out of space on the old window and install the new day figure to be seen in the morning by the citizens.

The seven day figures 

At the first sight the seven figures appear to represent only seven days of the week, but in reality they depict the seven ancient gods, seven planets and seven basic metals.
 Sunday: It is represented as a female figure with a blue shirt, red skirt and wide belt, with a gold circle with rays around the head, representing the gold symbol. For Romans and Greeks the Sun was a God (Sol or Helios), but this god in feminine clothes shows that the author took into account that the sun in the German language is female (Die Sonne). It is believed that the position of the arms of the figure symbolize the Sun God movement that raises or lowers the riches of the earth.

 Monday: It is a female figure dressed in blue dress, with bow and arrow in her hands and a half-moon head, the symbol of silver. Protector or Mistress of the night, the moon is the lunar Artemis from the Greeks or Diana from Romans, the goddess of the hunt, protector of female nature, constantly changing.
 Tuesday: It is a male with red shirt and blue vest, wearing a helmet, he represents the alchemistical symbol of iron. Represents the God Ares or Mars, carries a spear to reproduce the image of a soldier. 
 Wednesday: It is a male figure with red coad and green vest, wearing the attributes of the Greek God Hermes, or Romans God Mercury: he carries a caduceus in his right hand and a money bag in his left hand. It has two wings on his helmet and boots, showing thereby that he is "messenger of the gods” traveling fast through levitation. The sign on his head is hermaphrodite nature and symbolises mercury or quicksilver, metal that can master the other elements. It is generally believed that Hermes was the god of trade and thieves, but in reality he was a messenger of mysteries and esoteric knowledge, a mediator between the visible world and the invisible one. Mercury or Hermes have no equivalent in German mythology, therefore the German name of the day Mittwoch means midweek.
 Thursday: is a figure that represents Jupiter or Zeus, with golden crown on his head, like a medieval king, with red shirt and ermine cloak. The right foot is placed on a globe, symbolising the universal. In his right hand he keeps the symbol of lightning, and in his left hand the symbol of thunder. Jupiter is the 'Sunny Sky God' in Indo-European culture, who controls thunder. Germans called him "Donnar" and therefore the name of this day of the week is "Donnerstag". On the head of Zeus there is the alchemical symbol of tin, metal protector, non-corrosive and creator of new alloys.
 Friday: female character representing Aphrodite or Venus, goddess of beauty and love. A winged figure is representing her mirror so she can admire her beauty. She wears a green skirt lined with red, and her chest and leg are unveiled.  She carries on her head the symbol of copper, the red metal symbolising passion, which is always associated with green earth that symbolises beauty. For Germans, Friday is the day of goddess "Freyja" (Freitag), who is also the goddess of love.
 Saturday: It is a figure that represents Saturn, father of the old gods. For Romans, Saturn was actually Cronos, the titanium Greek refugee in Italy who taught the Romans agriculture and in whose honor is celebrating Saturnalia, when people were fed at state expenses. In the past, Saturn figurine held in his hands a child who he was preparing to swallow, because, according to prophecy, one of his sons would follow to unseat him. His mother, Rhea, managed to rescue Zeus, the youngest son, but when he reached adulthood Cronos ordered him to bring to light his swallowed brothers. The figure is naked to the waist, has blue shirt and red shorts who hangs around the waistband. On his head he has the mark of lead, symbol of stagnation and stop motion. Nobody knows exactly why he has a wooden leg (prosthesis). Perhaps it is a misunderstanding, arising from the fact that in ancient statue legs were wrapped in strips of cloth that were opened only for the holidays. All European languages uses for Saturday an Old Testament term Sabbath. Only English kept the old name linked to Saturn: Saturday.

Sighișoara
Clock towers in Romania